Neomaso is a genus of dwarf spiders that was first described by Raymond Robert Forster in 1970.

Species
 it contains twenty-two species:
Neomaso abnormis Millidge, 1991 – Chile
Neomaso aequabilis Millidge, 1991 – Argentina
Neomaso angusticeps Millidge, 1985 – Chile
Neomaso antarcticus (Hickman, 1939) – Kerguelen, Marion Is.
Neomaso articeps Millidge, 1991 – Chile
Neomaso arundicola Millidge, 1991 – Brazil
Neomaso bilobatus (Tullgren, 1901) – Chile
Neomaso claggi Forster, 1970 (type) – Chile, South Georgia
Neomaso damocles Miller, 2007 – Brazil, Argentina
Neomaso defoei 	(F. O. Pickard-Cambridge, 1899) – Chile (Juan Fernandez Is.)
Neomaso fagicola Millidge, 1985 – Chile
Neomaso fluminensis Millidge, 1991 – Chile
Neomaso insperatus Millidge, 1991 – Argentina
Neomaso insulanus Millidge, 1991 – Chile (Juan Fernandez Is.)
Neomaso minimus Millidge, 1985 – Chile
Neomaso parvus Millidge, 1985 – Chile
Neomaso patagonicus (Tullgren, 1901) – Chile, Argentina
Neomaso peltatus Millidge, 1985 – Chile
Neomaso pollicatus (Tullgren, 1901) – Chile, Argentina, Falkland Is.
Neomaso scutatus Millidge, 1985 – Chile
Neomaso setiger Millidge, 1991 – Chile
Neomaso vicinus Millidge, 1991 – Argentina

See also
 List of Linyphiidae species (I–P)

References

Araneomorphae genera
Linyphiidae
Spiders of Africa
Spiders of Asia
Spiders of South America
Taxa named by Raymond Robert Forster